Wang Xiji (born 26 July 1921) is a Chinese aerospace engineer. The chief designer of China's first sounding rocket (T-7), first space launch vehicle (Long March 1) and first recoverable satellites, he was awarded the Two Bombs, One Satellite Meritorious Medal in 1999. He is an academician of the Chinese Academy of Sciences and the International Academy of Astronautics, and was inducted into the International Astronautical Federation Hall of Fame in 2016. Wang turned 100 in July 2021.

Early life and education 
Wang was born in July 1921 into a merchant family in Kunming, Yunnan, China. He is a member of the Bai ethnic minority from Dali Bai Autonomous Prefecture. He graduated from the Department of Mechanical Engineering of National Southwestern Associated University in 1942, and went to the United States in 1948 to study at the Virginia Polytechnic Institute, earning his master's degree in 1949. When the People's Republic of China was founded, he abandoned his doctoral studies and returned to China in 1950.

Career

Sounding rockets 

After returning to China, Wang taught at the Dalian Institute of Technology, Shanghai Jiao Tong University, and Shanghai University of Science and Technology. In 1958, when Wang was serving as professor and vice chair of the Department of Engineering Mechanics at Shanghai Jiao Tong University, he was abruptly appointed chief engineer of the Shanghai Institute of Mechanical and Electrical Engineering. Only after he arrived at his new workplace did he learn that China had started its satellite program and the institute was responsible for developing rockets for satellite launches. The institute had very few experienced scientists. Other than Wang Xiji and his former classmate , who was the deputy director of the institute, there were only two visiting professors, Bian Yingui (卞荫贵) and Li Minhua. The rest of the institute consisted of a few hundred university students with an average age of 21. Even Wang and Yang had little knowledge about rockets and had to learn on the fly.

Working with severe shortages of technical experience, fund, and equipment, Wang's team managed to develop China's first sounding rocket, the T7-M. After a failed first launch in January 1960, the second launch on 19 February 1960 was successful. Wang later developed 12 types of sounding rockets, including many recoverable and reusable designs.

Space launch vehicle and recoverable satellites 
In the 1960s, Wang proposed the design for the Long March 1, China's first space launch vehicle, which launched China's first satellite, the Dong Fang Hong I, in 1970. He subsequently led the design of China's first recoverable satellite, the Jian Bing 1. After an initial failure in 1974, it was successfully launched in 1975, making China the third country in the world to launch a recoverable satellite. Wang's recoverable satellites achieved a higher success rate than the Corona (Discoverer) program of the United States and the Zenit series of the Soviet Union.

Crewed spacecraft 
In the late 1960s, Wang proposed the Shuguang project for crewed spacecraft. Although initially approved by Mao Zedong, it was later cancelled for shortage of funds. When China restarted the Shenzhou program in the 1990s, Wang served as a senior supervisor of the project, which succeeded in putting the first Chinese astronaut into orbit in 2003.

Other programs 
In 2002, Wang chaired a national policy committee that created a report outlining the future directions for the space and missile programs of China.

The energy would be transmitted to earth in the form of microwave or laser. The idea first appeared in Isaac Asimov's 1941 science fiction short story "Reason".

Honours and recognition 
Wang was elected an academician of the International Academy of Astronautics and the Chinese Academy of Sciences in 1993.

He was twice conferred the Special Prize of the State Science and Technology Progress Award (in 1985 and 1990), in addition to a First Class prize and a Second Class prize. He was awarded the Ho Leung Ho Lee Prize for science and technology progress. In 1999, Wang was awarded the Two Bombs, One Satellite Meritorious Medal. In 2016, he became the first Chinese inductee into the International Astronautical Federation Hall of Fame.

References 

1921 births
Living people
Bai people
Chinese aerospace engineers
Chinese centenarians
Chinese expatriates in the United States
Academic staff of Dalian University of Technology
Engineers from Yunnan
Members of the Chinese Academy of Sciences
Men centenarians
National Southwestern Associated University alumni
People from Kunming
Academic staff of Shanghai Jiao Tong University
Academic staff of Shanghai University
Virginia Tech alumni